Ribes sanguineum, the flowering currant, redflower currant, red-flowering currant, or red currant is a North American species of flowering plant in the family Grossulariaceae, native to the western United States and Canada.

Description
It is naturally multi-stemmed with an upright-arching to rounded habit, although it can be grown in tree form.

The bark is dark brownish-grey with prominent paler brown lenticels.

When young in spring, they have a strong resinous scent.

Taxonomy

Varieties

Etymology 
The Latin specific epithet sanguineum means 'blood-red'.

Distribution 
It is native to the western United States, Canada and Mexico. In western British Columbia, Washington, and Oregon, it is distributed widely in the moist regions west of the Cascades. In California it is restricted to areas near the coast, and can be found as far south as Santa Barbara County. In Mexico, it is only found on the Pacific island of Guadalupe, where it may be extirpated. Although its conservation status is secure across the rest of its range, in Idaho it is critically imperiled and is found only rarely in Bonner, Kootenai, Benewah, and Adams counties.

It is widely cultivated and naturalized throughout temperate Europe and Australasia.

Ecology 

The early spring nectar of red-flowering currant is used by hummingbirds as well as butterflies, which along with moths browse the leaves in their larval stage. Deer and elk occasionally browse the leaves, and the berries are consumed by birds and small mammals. Its branches provide nesting habitat for birds.

The species is a host to white pine blister rust, which led to eradication efforts in the early to mid 20th century.  From the 1920s the genus Ribes was federally restricted within the United States until the ban was lifted in 1966 due to increased resistance among both Ribes and Western white pine populations.

Red-flowering currant is shade tolerant but prefers sunny sites. It tolerates drought well, but prefers cool and moist conditions.

As an invasive species 
Red-flowering currant has been an invasive species in New Zealand since it was naturalized in 1904, where it forms dense stands in shrublands and along waterways which crowd out native vegetation.

It is considered a 'significant environmental weed' in Tasmania, though only a minor problem as it is not widespread.

Cultivation
R. sanguineum was introduced into cultivation in Britain in the fall of 1826 by Scottish botanist David Douglas, via seeds he had sent back during his explorations for the Royal Horticultural Society in the Pacific Northwest. It and its varieties and cultivars became immediately popular among English gardeners. The noted botanist and RHS member John Lindley remarked: 

It remains a popular garden shrub, valued for its brightly colored and scented flowers in early spring, and birds and habitat support. Numerous cultivars have been selected with flowers ranging from white to dark red. The following cultivars have gained the Royal Horticultural Society’s Award of Garden Merit: 
'Koja' 
 'Poky's Pink' 
 = 'Ubric'

Uses 
Both indigenous and non-indigenous people use the berries for food, eating them fresh or dried or making them into jams, pies, juice, or syrup. The flowers can be used to infuse beverages, especially spirits.

References

External links

Jepson Flora Project: Ribes sanguineum
Ribes sanguineum — Calphotos Photo gallery, University of California

sanguineum
Flora of the Western United States
Plants described in 1813
Garden plants of North America
Shrubs
Drought-tolerant plants
Bird food plants
Flora of British Columbia
Flora of Mexican Pacific Islands